Everett Piper (born 1959) is a retired university administrator and conservative commentator. He is the author of Not a Day Care: The Devastating Consequences of Abandoning Truth and a columnist for The Washington Times. He served as President of Oklahoma Wesleyan University from August 2002 until his retirement in May of 2019.

Early life
Piper grew up in Hillsdale, Michigan. He earned his B.A. from Spring Arbor University. M.A. from Bowling Green State University, and Ph.D. from Michigan State University.

Career
Piper was Vice President for Advancement at Grace College & Seminary in Indiana, then served as Dean of Students at Greenville College in Illinois. Before becoming President of Oklahoma Wesleyan, Piper was vice president for student development at Spring Arbor University in Michigan.

Piper blogs at politicalmavens.com and crosswalk.com. He is a contributing columnist for The Washington Times. Piper has appeared on Fox News, Fox & Friends, The O'Reilly Factor, Tucker Carlson Tonight, Fox's Varney and Co., The Glenn Beck Program, The Dana Loesch Show, The 700 Club with Pat Robertson, CBN News, The Adam Carolla Show and he has been featured on NBC Today as well as NRA TV, CRTV and others.  He is a frequent radio commentator, appearing on dozens of networks including Air America, KWON, KYFM, and KFAQ.     
  
Piper is the author of the viral op-ed, "This is Not a Daycare, It's a University"; The Wrong Side of the Door: Why Ideas Matter (2009), a collection of his essays, republished by Camden House Books under the title, Why I Am a "Liberal" and Other Conservative Ideas;, Not a Day Care:  The Devastating Consequences of Abandoning Truth, (2017), and Grow Up:  Life isn't Safe, but it's Good, (2021), the latter two published by Regnery Publishing.

In March 2016, Dr. Piper received the Jeane Kirkpatrick Award for Academic Freedom at the Conservative Political Action Conference (CPAC).

References

External links
 Oklahoma Wesleyan University website

Living people
Bowling Green State University alumni
Michigan State University alumni
Presidents of Oklahoma Wesleyan University
American columnists
1959 births